Leonard Dinnerstein (May 5, 1934 – January 22, 2019) was an American historian and author. He was a professor at the University of Arizona and was a specialist on Antisemitism in the United States.

He was born in the Bronx, to parents Abraham and Lillian, née Kubrick. The Dinnerstein's were of Jewish descent, with ancestors from Austria, Romania, what became Belarus.

He attended Theodore Roosevelt High School in New York City, and graduated from the City College of New York before pursuing further study in American history at Columbia University. His dissertation was directed by William Leuchtenburg.

After completing his doctorate, Dinnerstein taught at New York Institute of Technology and Fairleigh Dickinson University. He then joined the University of Arizona faculty as professor from 1970 to 2004.

Dinnerstein died of complications from kidney failure at the age of 84, in Tucson, Arizona.

Awards 
1994: National Jewish Book Award in the Jewish History category for Antisemitism in America

Books

The Leo Frank Case, 1968. Columbia University Press
Ethnic Americans : a history of immigration
Antisemitism in America
Jews in the South
American vistas (1971)
America and the survivors of the Holocaust (1982)
Natives and strangers : a multicultural history of Americans

References

Further reading
 Gerber, David A. "Leonard Dinnerstein (1934–2019): The Historian and His Subject." American Jewish History 105.1 (2021): 235-245. online

External links

1934 births
2019 deaths
20th-century American historians
American male non-fiction writers
21st-century American historians
New York Institute of Technology faculty
Fairleigh Dickinson University faculty
University of Arizona faculty
City College of New York alumni
Columbia Graduate School of Arts and Sciences alumni
Writers from the Bronx
Jewish American historians
American people of Belarusian-Jewish descent
American people of Austrian-Jewish descent
American people of Romanian-Jewish descent
Historians from New York (state)
20th-century American male writers
21st-century American Jews